Kissimmee Gateway Airport , formerly known as Kissimmee Municipal Airport, is a public airport in Kissimmee, a city in Osceola County, Florida, United States. The airport is located 16 nautical miles (30 km) southwest of the central business district of Orlando. It is owned and operated by the City of Kissimmee.

The airport does not offer scheduled passenger service. DayJet formerly provided "on-demand" service to 12 cities, but suspended all operations in September 2008.

Facilities and aircraft
Today it hosts a variety of general aviation aircraft operations, including a major facility for the restoration of classic military aircraft from the World War II era to flying condition. The airport has an operational control tower and a Category I instrument landing system (ILS) on its main runway. It is considered a general aviation reliever airport to Orlando International Airport.

For the 12-month period ending December 31, 2001, the airport had 150,388 aircraft operations, an average of 412 per day: 98% general aviation, 2% air taxi, <1% military and <1% scheduled commercial. There are 206 aircraft based at this airport: 71% single-engine, 22% multi-engine, 4% jet and 3% helicopter.

History
 For the World War II use of the airport, see: Kissimmee Army Airfield
The airport opened in April 1940 by the United States Army Air Forces.  Known as Kissimmee Army Airfield, it was used as part of the Air University Army Air Forces School of Applied Tactics (AAFSAT) tactical combat simulation school in Central and Northern Florida. Training was moved to southern California in January 1944, and the military use of the field was phased down.   The airfield was closed on 7 July 1945 and returned to civilian use by the end of the year.

References

External links
  brochure from CFASPP
 
 

Airports in Florida
Transportation buildings and structures in Osceola County, Florida
Buildings and structures in Kissimmee, Florida
1940 establishments in Florida
Airports established in 1940